The 2021–22 UEFA Europa Conference League qualifying phase and play-off round began on 6 July and ended on 26 August 2021.

A total of 163 teams competed in the qualifying system of the 2021–22 UEFA Europa Conference League, which includes the qualifying phase and the play-off round, with 24 teams in Champions Path and 139 teams in Main Path. The 22 winners in the play-off round advanced to the group stage, to join the 10 losers of the Europa League play-off round.

Times are CEST (UTC+2), as listed by UEFA (local times, if different, are in parentheses).

Teams

Champions Path

The Champions Path included league champions which were eliminated from the Champions Path qualifying phase of the Champions League and the Champions Path qualifying phase of the Europa League, and consisted of the following rounds:
Second qualifying round (18 teams): 18 teams which entered this round (including 15 losers of the Champions League first qualifying round and 3 losers of the Champions League preliminary qualifying round).
Third qualifying round (10 teams): 9 winners of the second qualifying round and 1 loser of the Champions League first qualifying round.
Play-off round (10 teams): 5 teams which entered this round (including 5 losers of the Europa League Champions Path third qualifying round), and 5 winners of the third qualifying round.

Below are the participating teams of the Champions Path (with their 2021 UEFA club coefficients, not to be used as seeding for the Champions Path, however), grouped by their starting rounds.

Notes

Main Path

The Main Path included league non-champions, and consisted of the following rounds:
First qualifying round (66 teams): 66 teams which entered in this round.
Second qualifying round (90 teams): 57 teams which entered in this round, and 33 winners of the first qualifying round.
Third qualifying round (54 teams): 9 teams which entered in this round, and 45 winners of the second qualifying round.
Play-off round (34 teams): 7 teams which entered this round (including 3 losers of the Europa League Main Path third qualifying round), and 27 winners of the third qualifying round.

Below are the participating teams of the League Path (with their 2021 UEFA club coefficients), grouped by their starting rounds.

Notes

Format
Each tie is played over two legs, with each team playing one leg at home. The team that scores more goals on aggregate over the two legs advance to the next round. If the aggregate score is level at the end of normal time of the second leg, the away goals rule is no longer applied starting from this season. To decide the winner of the tie, extra time is played, and if the same amount of goals are scored by both teams during extra time, the tie is decided by a penalty shoot-out.

Schedule
The schedule of the competition was as follows (all draws were held at the UEFA headquarters in Nyon, Switzerland).

First qualifying round

The draw for the first qualifying round was held on 15 June 2021, 13:30 CEST.

Seeding
A total of 66 teams played in the first qualifying round. Seeding of teams was based on their 2021 UEFA club coefficients. Teams from the same association could not be drawn against each other. Prior to the draw, UEFA formed eight groups, seven of four seeded teams and four unseeded teams, and one of five seeded teams and five unseeded teams, in accordance with the principles set by the Club Competitions Committee. Numbers were pre-assigned for each team by UEFA, with the draw held in two runs, one for Groups 1–7 with eight teams and one for Group 8 with ten teams. The first team drawn in each tie would be the home team of the first leg.

Summary

The first legs were played on 6 and 8 July, and the second legs were played on 13 and 15 July 2021.

The winners of the ties advanced to the Main Path second qualifying round. The losers were eliminated from European competitions for the season.

Matches

Second qualifying round

The draw for the second qualifying round was held on 16 June 2021, 13:30 CEST.

Seeding
A total of 108 teams played in the second qualifying round. They were divided into two paths:
Champions Path (18 teams): The teams, whose identity was not known at the time of draw, were seeded as following:
Seeded: 15 of the 16 losers of the 2021–22 UEFA Champions League first qualifying round (1 of the teams received a bye to the third qualifying round).
Unseeded: 3 losers of the 2021–22 UEFA Champions League preliminary round.
Main Path (90 teams): 57 teams which entered in this round, and 33 winners of the first qualifying round. Seeding of teams was based on their 2021 UEFA club coefficients. For the winner of the first qualifying round, whose identity was not known at the time of draw, the club coefficient of the highest-ranked remaining team in each tie was used. Teams from the same association could not be drawn against each other.
Prior to the draw, UEFA formed three groups in the Champions Path of five seeded teams and one unseeded team, and nine groups in the Main Path of five seeded teams and five unseeded teams, in accordance with the principles set by the Club Competitions Committee. In each group of the Champions Path, firstly, a seeded team was drawn against the only unseeded team, and then, the remaining four seeded teams were drawn against each other. In the Main Path, numbers were pre-assigned for each team by UEFA, with the draw held in one run for Groups 1–9 with ten teams. The first team drawn in each tie would be the home team of the first leg.

Notes

Summary

The first legs were played on 20, 21 and 22 July, and the second legs were played on 27 and 29 July 2021.

The winners of the ties advanced to the third qualifying round of their respective path. The losers were eliminated from European competitions for the season.

Matches

Third qualifying round

The draw for the third qualifying round was held on 19 July 2021, 14:00 CEST.

Seeding
A total of 64 teams played in the third qualifying round. They were divided into two paths:
Champions Path (10 teams): 9 winners of the second qualifying round (Champions Path), whose identity was not known at the time of draw, and 1 loser from the first qualifying round of the Champions League which received a bye to this round (Shamrock Rovers). There was no seeding. Due to political reasons, teams from Bosnia Herzegovina and Kosovo could not be drawn against each other, thus the winners of the ties between Borac Banja Luka/Linfield and Prishtina/Connah's Quay Nomads could not be drawn against each other.
Main Path (54 teams): 9 teams which entered in this round, and 45 winners of the second qualifying round (Main Path). Seeding of teams was based on their 2021 UEFA club coefficients. For the winners of the second qualifying round, whose identity was not known at the time of draw, the club coefficient of the highest-ranked remaining team in each tie was used. Teams from the same association could not be drawn against each other.
Prior to the draw, UEFA formed seven groups in the Main Path, six of four seeded teams and four unseeded teams, and one of three seeded teams and three unseeded teams, in accordance with the principles set by the Club Competitions Committee. In the Main Path, numbers were pre-assigned for each team by UEFA, with the draw held in two runs, one for Groups 1–6 with eight teams and one for Group 7 with six teams. The first team drawn in each tie would be the home team of the first leg.

Notes

Summary

The first legs were played on 3 and 5 August, and the second legs were played on 10 and 12 August 2021.

The winners of the ties advanced to the play-off round of their respective path. The losers were eliminated from European competitions for the season.

Matches

Play-off round

The draw for the play-off round was held on 2 August 2021, 14:00 CEST.

Seeding
A total of 44 teams played in the play-off round. They were divided into two paths:
Champions Path (10 teams): The teams, whose identity was not known at the time of draw, were seeded as following:
Seeded: 5 losers of the 2021–22 UEFA Europa League third qualifying round (Champions Path).
Unseeded: 5 winners of the third qualifying round (Champions Path).
Main Path (34 teams): 4 teams which entered in this round, 27 winners of the third qualifying round (Main Path), and 3 losers of the 2021–22 UEFA Europa League third qualifying round (Main Path). Seeding of teams was based on their 2021 UEFA club coefficients. For the winners of the third qualifying round and losers of the Europa League third qualifying round, whose identity was not known at the time of draw, the club coefficient of the highest-ranked remaining team in each tie was used. Teams from the same association could not be drawn against each other.
Prior to the draw, UEFA formed four groups in the Main Path, three of four seeded teams and four unseeded teams, and one of five seeded teams and five unseeded teams, in accordance with the principles set by the Club Competitions Committee. In the Main Path, numbers were pre-assigned for each team by UEFA, with the draw held in two runs, one for Groups 1–3 with eight teams and one for Group 4 with ten teams. The first team drawn in each tie would be the home team of the first leg.

Notes

Summary

The first legs were played on 19 August, and the second legs were played on 26 August 2021.

The winners of the ties advanced to the group stage. The losers were eliminated from European competitions for the season.

Matches

References

External links

1
July 2021 sports events in Europe
August 2021 sports events in Europe